Balla Faye (born 17 September 1994) is a Senegalese footballer who plays for Cortona Camucia Calcio.

References

External links

1994 births
Living people
Senegalese footballers
Senegalese expatriate footballers
S.C. Olhanense players
Association football defenders